Ildikó Szendrődi-Kővári (8 May 1930 – 29 September 2022) was a Hungarian alpine skier. She competed at the 1952 Winter Olympics and the 1964 Winter Olympics.

References

1930 births
2022 deaths
Hungarian female alpine skiers
Olympic alpine skiers of Hungary
Alpine skiers at the 1952 Winter Olympics
Alpine skiers at the 1964 Winter Olympics
Skiers from Budapest
20th-century Hungarian women